Booker T. Washington School, also known as District School #10 and Washington High School, is a historic school building located at Terre Haute, Vigo County, Indiana. It was built in 1914 and was designed by the firm of Miller & Yeager Architects.  It is a two-story, rectangular brick building with Classical Revival style design elements.

The structure was listed on the National Register of Historic Places in 2002 for its historical significance in African-American education in the area.

In recent years through the end of the 2001–2002 school year, the building has housed Booker T. Washington High School, a school for pregnant, parenting and alternative students. Because of safety issues and compliance with current state standards, Washington High School moved from its original location to a new structure near Terre Haute South Vigo High School. As of June 2008, the original building was undergoing appraisal in preparation for being listed for sale.

See also
 List of things named after Booker T. Washington

References

African-American history of Indiana
School buildings on the National Register of Historic Places in Indiana
Neoclassical architecture in Indiana
School buildings completed in 1914
Buildings and structures in Terre Haute, Indiana
National Register of Historic Places in Terre Haute, Indiana
1914 establishments in Indiana